The discography of Teena Marie, an American R&B and soul singer, consists of 14 studio albums, 13 compilation albums, and 35 singles since her debut album Wild and Peaceful in 1979. She has been awarded with two gold albums and has 6 top-ten albums and 7 top-ten singles on the United States R&B charts.

Albums

Studio albums

Compilation albums
Charting compilations

Complete list
Greatest Hits (1985, Motown)
Greatest Hits (1991, Epic)
I Need Your Lovin': The Best of Teena Marie (1994, Motown)
Motown Milestones: The Best of Teena Marie (1996, Motown)
Lovergirl: The Teena Marie Story (1997, Epic)
Love Songs (2000, Sony Music)
Ultimate Collection (2000, Hip-O)
20th Century Masters – The Millennium Collection: The Best of Teena Marie (2001, Motown)
Super Hits (2002, Legacy)
Icon (2011, Motown)
Playlist: The Very Best of Teena Marie (2011, Legacy)
First Class Love: Rare Tee (2011, Hip-O Select)
John Morales presents Teena Marie – Love Songs & Funky Beats, Remixed with Loving Devotion (2021, BBE)

Singles

Notes
  Rick James sang uncredited co-lead vocals on "I'm a Sucker for Your Love".

Collaborations
In 1981:
 Marie sang a duet with Rick James in his song, "Fire and Desire", from his Street Songs album.
 Marie sang the single "Gigolette" by Ozone, which she also co-wrote and produced.

In 1982:
 Marie sang a duet with Rick James in his song, "Happy", from his Throwin' Down album.
 Marie sang Carl Anderson's song, "A.W.O.L.", on his Absence With Out Love album.

In 1985:
 Marie sang the song, "14K", on the soundtrack of the movie, The Goonies.
 Marie sang Q.T. Hush's song, "Soul Mates", on the Q.T. Hush album. She also worked as its co-producer and she sang back-up vocals.

In 1986:
 Marie was one of the featured vocalists in the King Dream Chorus & Crew ensemble single, "King Holiday". 
 Marie sang the song, "Lead Me On", on the soundtrack of the movie, Top Gun.

In 1989:
 Marie sang the song, "Bad Boy", on the soundtrack album of the movie, Tap.
 Marie sang back-up on Grady Harrell's album, Come Play With Me.

In 1990:
 Marie sang Bernadette Cooper's tracks, "Drama According to Bernadette Cooper" and "Epilogue: Movie Produce Her", from Cooper's Drama According to Bernadette Cooper album.

In 1991:
 Marie sang Cheba's single, "Business Doin' Pleasure". 
 Marie was one of the featured vocalists in the Peace Choir ensemble single, "Give Peace A Chance".
In 1995:
 Marie sang L. A. Nash's song, "Ain't a Damn Thing Changed", on his L. A. Nash album.

In 1996:
 Marie sang Pamela Williams' songs, "The Secret Garden" and "Latin Lullaby" on Williams' Saxtress album. 
 Marie sang Snoop Dogg's songs, "Up Jump Tha Boogie" and "Vapors", from his Tha Doggfather album. 
 Marie sang YoYo's song, "Body Work", from her Total Control album.

In 1997:
 Marie sang Domino's song, "Come On Over".
 Marie sang Gooch's song, "When It's Late", from his A Lot On It album.

In 1998:
 Marie sang in Club DJ, Danny Tenaglia's song, "Baby, Do You Feel Me?", which she also co-wrote, on his Tourism album. 
 Marie sang "Wishing on a Star" on New York Undercover: A Night at Natalie's, the second and final soundtrack to the Fox television series, New York Undercover.

In 1999:
 Marie sang Domino's song, "Cum On Over", on his Remember Me album.

In 2000:
  Marie sang "Jazzy Rugrat Love" (sung to her hit "Portuguese Love") as a bonus enhanced track on the soundtrack of the Nickelodeon movie, Rugrats in Paris: The Movie.

In 2001:
 Marie sang Eve's song, "Life Is So Hard" on her Scorpion album.

In 2002:
 Marie sang Pamela Williams' song, "I Am Love", on Williams' smooth jazz album, Evolution. 
 Marie sang Afu-Ra's song, "Open", on his Life Force Radio album. 
 Marie sang the song "Shorty Down" on the soundtrack of the movie, Undisputed.

In 2006:
Marie sang Steven Seagal's song, "BBQ" on his Mojo Priest album.

In 2008:
 Marie sang George Duke's song, "Sudan" from his Dukey Treats album.
 Marie sang Focus' song, "8.18.01" from his Dedicated album.

In 2013:
 Marie sang George Duke's song, "Ball & Chain" from his Dreamweaver album.

References

Discographies of American artists
Rhythm and blues discographies
Soul music discographies